Sir Courtenay Boyle, KCH (3 September 1770 – 21 May 1844) was an officer of the Royal Navy during the French Revolutionary Wars. In 1807 he served as a Member of Parliament for Bandon.

Origins
 
Courtenay Boyle was born in 1770, the 3rd but 2nd surviving son of
Edmund Boyle, 7th Earl of Cork by his first wife Anne Courtenay, second daughter and co-heiress of Kellond Courtenay of Painsford in the parish of Ashprington in Devon, a niece of John Montagu, 4th Earl of Sandwich. Courtenay Boyle was a relative of Captain Sir Charles Boyle, who commanded the 98-gun  at the Battle of Cape Finisterre in 1805. He was also a relative of Commodore Robert Boyle, who died in a hurricane off Jamaica while commanding a squadron dispatched to the West Indies.

Career

American War of Independence 
He entered the Royal Navy on 12 September 1780, serving as a midshipman on board the frigate  frigate, commanded by Sir Hyde Parker. In this ship he was present at the Battle of Dogger Bank between the squadron under the command of Sir Hyde Parker, the father of the Latonas captain, and a Dutch force under Admiral Johan Zoutman. Some time later he fell from the booms into the orlop, and was obliged to go on shore to recover.

He joined  and remained in that ship until 8 April 1783, when he was sent to the Royal Naval Academy at Portsmouth to finish his nautical studies, where he remained until March 1784. He was appointed to the 28-gun , under the auspices of Horatio Nelson, and after visiting the West Indies, returned to Spithead in the summer of 1787. With HMS Boreas having been put out of commission, Boyle was received at the recommendation of Nelson on board , bearing Lord Hood's flag; and in that ship he continued his services until 25 November 1788, when he was transferred into , the flagship of Admiral Joseph Peyton, by whom, on 5 June 1789, was sent on board the frigate , serving with the Mediterranean Fleet. Promoted to lieutenant on 22 November 1790, Boyle subsequently served on board .

French Revolutionary Wars 
At the beginning of the French Revolutionary Wars in 1793, Boyle embarked as a lieutenant on board the 74-gun third rate ship of the line . This ship, after fitting at Plymouth, was attached to the squadron under Rear-Admiral John Gell that conveyed the East India fleet to a certain latitude and then proceeded to cruise off the coast of Spain. During the spring of 1795 he embarked in the 50-gun , to bring over Princess Caroline of Brunswick from Cuxhaven. On 6 April 1795, just on his return from that service, he was promoted to commander; and during the month of October he was given command of the 18-gun brig , lying at Deptford.

Boyle was sent to cruise off the Texel and Coruña for the protection of English packets, where he destroyed several row-boats. Soon after returning home, he received orders to refit the Kangaroo. He also captured a French privateer of eight guns and 48 men, and the 14-gun Spanish lugger Purísima Concepción. Shortly before the French expedition to Ireland in support of the Irish patriots, the Kangaroo was driven by bad weather into Bantry Bay, and had soon after sighted a French fleet, which Boyle believed to consist from nineteen to twenty-two sail. He was promoted to captain on 30 June 1797. In June 1799 he was appointed to command the 24-gun HMS Cormorant, and after taking convoy to Lisbon and Gibraltar, he joined Lord Keith's squadron at Leghorn. On 20 May 1800, the Cormorant was wrecked off Damietta due to faulty navigational charts. Contrary to the usages of war, Captain Boyle was kept in close confinement for nearly three months. Having recovered his liberty, he was acquitted for the loss of his ship.

Napoleonic Wars
In the spring of 1803 Boyle was given command of the 32-gun frigate  and ordered to the Mediterranean, where he was actively employed under Nelson during an important part of his Lordship's command on that station. On 11 July 1804, three of Seahorses boats took part in an action against twelve French settees, most of them laden with cargo, lying at La Vandour, in the bay of Hyères. Boyle was frequently chased away by the French ships, but carried out his duties. On 18 January 1805 the Seahorse, while cruising with HMS Active along the French coast, were sighted and pursued by the whole French fleet, but effected their escape.

Boyle sailed to communicate the news that the French had put to sea to Lord Nelson, who was lying at anchor north of Sardinia. On 4 May 1805, while cruising off the southern Spanish coast, Boyle received intelligence that a Spanish convoy, chiefly laden on government account with gunpowder for the gun-boats at Málaga, Ceuta and Algeciras, was upon the coast. He then kept close along the Spanish coast, and at 2 p.m. the convoy was sighted from the mast-head of the Seahorse. At 5 pm. Boyle observed that the Spanish vessels hauled into San Pedro, an anchorage to the eastward of Cape de Gata, under the protection of a fort and several schooners and mortar launches. He then sent his first lieutenant, George Downie, and other men of his crew in a cutter to board the vessels. Covered by the fire of the Seahorse, Downie boarded a Spanish brig, laden with 1170 quintals of powder. Finding that the Spanish gun-boats continued to fire on the Seahorse, which had already suffered damage to her main topgallantmast and had had several braces and bowlines shot away, the Seahorse discontinued the engagement and stood out to the offing.

Last years of service 
In the summer of 1805 Boyle exchanged into , a Spanish prize frigate, and returned to England. His last appointment afloat was in May 1806, when he was appointed to command HMS Royal William, the flagship of Admiral Sir George Montagu at Spithead; which ship he retained until June 1809, when he succeeded Captain George Henry Towry as a Commissioner of Transports. The control of the dockyard at Sheerness was confided to him in the summer of 1814. Some time after, he was appointed by an order in council to superintend the bringing up of the arrears of the accounts left unaudited by the Transport Board at the time of its dissolution, and he subsequently obtained a seat on the Navy Board.

In 1832 he was nominated a Knight-Commander of the Hanoverian Guelphic Order, and made a Knight Bachelor on 3 December that year. He was promoted to rear-admiral on the retired list on 22 July 1830, but in 1840 was restored to the active list, and was promoted to the rank of vice-admiral of the red in November 1841. On the 1841 census he was living at Marine Parade, Brighton.

New Zealand Company
In 1825 Boyle was a director of the New Zealand Company, a venture chaired by the wealthy John George Lambton, Whig MP (and later 1st Earl of Durham), that made the first attempt to colonise New Zealand.

Marriage and children
On 16 April 1799 he married Caroline Amelia Poyntz, a daughter of William Poyntz of Midgham House in the parish of Thatcham, Berkshire. The estate of Midgham had been purchased by Stephen Poyntz (1685-1750), a diplomat born at Cornhill in the City of London. 
The ancient and prominent Poyntz family first appeared in England in the late 12th century as feudal barons of Curry Mallet in Somerset, and were later seated at Iron Acton in Gloucestershire. By his wife he had 3 sons and 3 daughters; among them was Mary Louisa Boyle (1810-1890), a popular novelist.

Footnotes
Notes

Citations

References 
 
 

1770 births
Irish sailors in the Royal Navy
Royal Navy vice admirals
Royal Navy personnel of the American Revolutionary War
Royal Navy personnel of the French Revolutionary Wars
British naval commanders of the Napoleonic Wars
1844 deaths
Members of the Parliament of the United Kingdom for County Cork constituencies (1801–1922)
UK MPs 1806–1807
Courtenay
Younger sons of earls